Mulata (Mulatta) is a Mexican drama film directed by Gilberto Martínez Solares. It was released in 1954 and starring Ninón Sevilla and Pedro Armendáriz.

Plot
In the Havana port, two mulatto children, Mateo (Ricardo Román) and Caridad (Ninón Sevilla) grow together. She is the daughter of a white man who died in a shipwreck, and a  black laundress of African origin. Over the years, Mateo falls for Caridad, but she is in love with a Mexican captain, Martin (Pedro Armendáriz), who accidentally met her at the port. The captain was also in love with Caridad and offers to live together and she accepts. Caridad work in a cabaret in the port and the owner, Guevara (René Cardona), is attracted to the girl, and in a moment of jealousy, tries to kill Martin. Martin falls in financial trouble and have to mortgage his boat to Guevara. When Martin returns to Veracruz, Mexico, Guevara feels himself like the new owner of Caridad.

Cast
 Ninón Sevilla ... Caridad
 Pedro Armendáriz ... Captain Martín
 René Cardona ... Guevara
 Ricardo Román ... Mateo
 Fanny Schiller ... Doña Rosario
 Ramón Valdés ... "Marinero" (uncredited)

Reviews
Mulata is not one of the classic melodramas of Ninón Sevilla. The film does not contain the extravagant elements that make  the indisputable classics Victimas del Pecado, Aventurera and Sensualidad; does not have the spectacular musical numbers in large series and complex choreography, which are found in almost all her films; and contains not humor like in Club de señoritas. But somehow Mulata is probably the film that is closer to the cultural roots of Sevilla, ethnic and social concerns and the varied and different forms of love that made her life so rich. Adapted from Mulatilla: Black Stamp, a novel by the Uruguayan writer Roberto Márquez Olivencia, the action takes place now in Cuba and tells the story of Caridad (a name that echoes the name of the Virgin patron of the island), the beautiful daughter a black slave who has to fight against those who exploit high positions, and men who only want her as a sexual object. Her life was marked by tragedy and she will be physically abused, betrayed and forced into prostitution. The story is told in flashback, from the memories of the Mexican sailor. The character is played of brutal way by the actor Pedro Armendariz. There is a long sequence on the beach that covers a celebration of a ritual dance of Santeria, the Yoruba religion shown by Ninon as important in her films as Victimas del Pecado and Yambaó. By 1954, the sequence is a strange and audacious mix of ethnography and sensationalism.

The film shows a sequence where several dancers resembling be naked during a ritual. In this regard, Ninon Sevilla revealed: Pedro Armendáriz had just returned from France, where he filmed "Lucrece Borgia" and counted me that in a scene rubbed a bunch of grapes on the breasts of an actress who was lying on a table and that down there was an actor who drank the juice of the grapes. And that only they could happen to the French. Mmmm I said, in this movie are going to show to the French that here in Mexico too there is imagination. I sent for a bag of black nylon panties in every sizes. On the beach scene did you put to all the dancers, so when lifted their legs, it seemed that they did not bring anything. This goes for the French.

References

External links
 
 Cinemateca cubana: Mulata

1954 films
Mexican black-and-white films
Films about race and ethnicity
Films about racism
Rumberas films
1950s Spanish-language films
Films set in Havana
Mexican drama films
1954 drama films
1950s Mexican films